White pelican may refer to:

Fauna
American white pelican, Pelecanus erythrorhynchos
Great white pelican, Pelecanus onocrotalus

Other
White Pelican Provincial Park in British Columbia, Canada